Kirkland is a civil parish, located on the banks of the River Wyre, midway between Preston and Lancaster, in the English county of Lancashire. It is also the historic name of what is now the village of Churchtown, within the parish. It is part of the Wyre district. In 2001 the parish had a population of 343, decreasing to 314 at the 2011 census.

Kirkland has a long history centred on its Grade I listed building, St Helen's, the parish church of Garstang St Helen (or Churchtown) and once known as the Cathedral of the Fylde. The church features:
a "lepers' window" or "squint" to enable those unfortunates an opportunity to attend its services;
a grave marker for the village's only victim of the Black Plague;
a large rafter, once known as the "new beam", supposedly presented to the parish by King Henry VIII at the time of the Reformation.

There are significant pointers such as a circular churchyard with several yew trees to its original use as a Druid temple. It was believed by some that the area may have been the site where Christian missionaries from Ireland first set foot in Lancashire at the end of the navigational portion of the River Wyre which flows to the Irish Sea some 14 miles away. St Helen's is one of only two Grade I listed buildings in the Borough of Wyre. 

Although known as "The Cross", the village has an 18th-century Grade II listed dialpost with a sundial at its head, at the top of Church Street. There are two pubs: the Punchbowl and the Horns Inn.

Kirkland was once a township in the ancient parish of Garstang. This became a civil parish in 1866, forming part of the Garstang Rural District from 1894 till 1974. It has since become part of the Borough of Wyre.

Along with Great Eccleston, Out Rawcliffe, Inskip-with-Sowerby and Upper Rawcliffe-with-Tarnacre, Kirkland forms part of the Great Eccleston ward of Wyre Borough Council.

See also

Listed buildings in Kirkland, Lancashire

References

External links 

 - using the name Churchtown
Lancashire Churches
Lancashire parish portal
A History of the County of Lancaster: Volume 7 Pages: 313-15
A History of the County of Lancaster: St Helen's Church, Kirkland

Civil parishes in Lancashire
Geography of the Borough of Wyre
The Fylde